Dublin by Lamplight or the Lamplight Laundry, at 35 Ballsbridge Terrace, Ballsbridge, Dublin, was a Protestant-run Magdalene Laundry, founded in 1856, that like other such laundries housed so-called "fallen women". It was administered by a committee of Anglican women, a matron, and a chaplain who was a Church of Ireland priest.

The motto of the asylum was "That they may recover themselves out of the snares of the devil" (II Timothy 2:24).

A chaplain and secretary to the laundry, Rev. Dr. James S. Fletcher DD (parish priest of Brookfield, Milltown Co. Dublin), wrote a paper titled Our Female Penitentiaries can be made self-supporting!, which was discussed at the International Prison Congress.

It was mentioned in James Joyce's short story Clay in Dubliners. 

The site of the institution has been redeveloped. There is a campaign to have the location commemorated with a plaque.

References

Magdalene asylums
Ballsbridge